The Riachuelo class are a Brazilian class of diesel-electric and nuclear-powered attack submarines developed by the state-owned shipyard Itaguaí Construções Navais, based on the French  as part of the Submarine Development Program (PROSUB), a naval modernization plan of the Brazilian Armed Forces.

Program history
In 2008, the presidents of Brazil and France, Luiz Inácio Lula da Silva and Nicolas Sarkozy, signed a strategic partnership to the construction of four conventionally-powered submarines, and the support for the development of the first Brazilian nuclear submarine, in a program called PROSUB.

Development and design
The project was initiated in 2010 with the Madeira Island base in Rio de Janeiro as the submarine development and manufacturing point. Between 2010 and 2012, a group of 31 engineers, 25 officers and 6 civil employees, received theoretical training by the DCNS in Cherbourg, France. In 2018, more than 400 Brazilian engineers worked only on the nuclear submarine project staff, originally formed by the group that received training in France. The first stage of construction of the conventionally-powered Riachuelo took place in France, with the cutting of the first steel plates of the structure. At this point, technology transfer from French technicians to Brazilians began.

Characteristics
The conventional Brazilian boats are larger in length, tonnage and cargo capacity compared to the French Scorpène class they are derived from.

Nuclear submarine
As part of the program, a fifth submarine, named Álvaro Alberto, will be powered by a nuclear propulsion. This unit has many similarities to his conventional predecessors of the Riachuelo class. Its  length and 6,000-ton displacement will be propelled by a  fully-electric propulsion system. 

The advantages of an SSN over a conventionally powered SSK are much longer endurance (a nuclear submarine can stay submerged for months and does not need refueling), and higher speed.

Units
There are the status of the five units:

Gallery

See also

 Future of the Brazilian Navy
 History of submarines

References

Attack submarines
Riachuelo-class submarine
Scorpène-class submarines
Submarine classes
Proposed ships
Ships built in Brazil